The 2000 Australian Grand Prix (officially known as the 2000 Qantas Australian Grand Prix) was a Formula One motor race held on 12 March 2000 at the Melbourne Grand Prix Circuit, Melbourne. It was the first race of the 2000 Formula One season. The 58-lap race was won by Michael Schumacher for the Ferrari team after starting from third position. Schumacher's new teammate for the 2000 season, Rubens Barrichello finished second in the other Ferrari, with Ralf Schumacher third for BMW-Williams.

Mika Häkkinen started on pole position in a McLaren, with teammate David Coulthard alongside him, but both retired with pneumatic valve failures. Three drivers made their Grand Prix debut: future world champion Jenson Button in a BMW-Williams, Nick Heidfeld in a Prost and Gastón Mazzacane in a Minardi. Mazzacane and Button retired from their debut race, and Heidfeld finished ninth, two laps behind.

Background 
Heading into the first race of the 2000 Formula One season, many were tipping Ferrari driver Michael Schumacher and  Drivers' Champion, McLaren's Mika Häkkinen as the main contenders to win the 2000 Drivers' Championship. Schumacher was favourite to win the Championship according to the bookmakers and by some former Formula One drivers, including Schumacher's teammate from the 1999 season, and new Jaguar driver Eddie Irvine. The last Drivers' Champion for Ferrari, Jody Scheckter, who did so in the 1979 season, also tipped Schumacher to win the Championship.

Out of the 11 teams and 22 drivers on the starting grid, three drivers made their debut. Nick Heidfeld joined the Prost team alongside Jean Alesi. The two replaced Prost's 1999 season line-up of Olivier Panis, who moved to McLaren as test driver and Jarno Trulli, who moved to Jordan alongside Heinz-Harald Frentzen following Damon Hill's retirement. At the Minardi team, Gastón Mazzacane replaced Luca Badoer, who opted to continue as Ferrari test driver, a role he began in 1997. The third rookie driver in the 2000 driver line-up was Jenson Button, who replaced Alessandro Zanardi at Williams. Button, at the time, became the youngest British driver ever to start a Formula One race. Many observers and fellow drivers alike had differing opinions of Williams' choice to take Button on. Sauber driver Mika Salo stated that because of Button's inexperience, he could "hurt himself or somebody else".

Practice
Four practice sessions were held before the Sunday race—two on Friday, and two on Saturday. The Friday morning and afternoon sessions each lasted an hour. The third and final practice sessions were held on Saturday morning and lasted 45 minutes. In the first practice session, held on a slippery track surface, Häkkinen set the fastest lap of 1 minute and 32.768 seconds, followed by Michael Schumacher, Rubens Barrichello, David Coulthard, Jacques Villeneuve, Ralf Schumacher, Heinz-Harald Frentzen, Jos Verstappen, Eddie Irvine and Alexander Wurz. During the session, Ricardo Zonta and Heidfeld spun into a gravel trap beside the circuit, Johnny Herbert's car had a possible engine failure that cut out its ignition system, and Michael Schumacher's driving was curtailed due to the on-board television camera mounted atop of his Ferrari melting a wiring loom. Although he removed the left-rear wheel of his car in an sideways accident at the fast sweeping turn 14 midway through the second practice session because he missed the braking point, Michael Schumacher recorded the day's fastest lap of 1 minute and 32.130 seconds. Coulthard was second and Barrichello third. The rest of the top ten were Häkkinen, Villeneuve, Pedro Diniz, Frentzen, Wurz, Zonta and Irvine.

In the third practice session, Michael Schumacher continued to run strongly with the fastest time of 1 minute and 30.439 seconds. Coulthard was 0.519 seconds behind in second place and Frentzen placed third. Fourth went to Barrichello and Trulli was fifth. Ralf Schumacher, Villeneuve, Herbert, Giancarlo Fisichella and Irvine followed in the top ten positions. Häkkinen's engine failed mid-way through his first lap, necessitating two teams of McLaren mechanics to spend 42 minutes dismantling both his and teammate's Coulthard's rear of their cars to change their engines and gearboxes to enable driving in the second practice session later that day. Michael Schumacher paced the final practice session with a lap of 1 minute and 30.390 seconds, ahead of Coulthard, Frentzen, Barrichello, Ralf Schumacher, Trulli, Pedro de la Rosa, Verstappen, Villeneuve and Herbert. On his fourth lap, Button crashed into the turn ten right-hand side barrier at  after clipping a kerb, removing the rear wheels from his Williams and heavily damaging its bodywork. The session was halted for ten minutes as track marshals extricated his car from the circuit.

Qualifying
Saturday's afternoon qualifying session lasted for an hour. Each driver was limited to twelve laps, with the starting order decided by the drivers' fastest laps. During this session, the 107% rule was in effect, which necessitated each driver set a time within 107% of the quickest lap to qualify for the race. Mika Häkkinen took pole position by three-tenths from teammate David Coulthard, after the pair locked out a McLaren front row to start the season. Michael Schumacher was disappointed with third after a spin by Coulthard had caused a red flag forcing him to abandon his final attempt. Coulthard said that it "was not the intention" for him to disrupt Schumacher on his final flying lap. The top three qualifying places were identical to what they had been in the previous two years. Schumacher's new Ferrari teammate, Rubens Barrichello, qualified fourth, with the Jordans of Heinz-Harald Frentzen and Jarno Trulli behind him on the third row. Eddie Irvine qualified seventh for Jaguar, with Jacques Villeneuve, Giancarlo Fisichella and Mika Salo completing the top ten. Ralf Schumacher was eleventh for the Williams-BMW, with rookie teammate Jenson Button qualifying 21st for his first race, setting a lap time 1.6 seconds slower. Behind Button was another rookie, Gastón Mazzacane, and in front was Jaguar's Johnny Herbert. Button later described his qualifying session by saying "It can't get worse than this".

Qualifying classification

Warm-up 
In Sunday morning's half an hour warm-up session, Barrichello paced the field with a time of 1 minute and 31.225 seconds. He was 1.573 seconds faster than Button in second place who had a small oil leak and fire in the pit lane. The two McLarens were third and fourth, with Häkkinen ahead of Coulthard. Verstappen was fifth and Fisichella sixth. Jean Alesi, Michael Schumacher, de la Rosa and Salo completed the top ten going into the race.

Race 
A total of 124,300 people attended the race. 21 of the 22 cars started on the grid, with Prost driver Alesi the only car to start from the pit lane. Häkkinen converted his pole position from qualifying to lead into the first corner at the start of the race. Coulthard and Schumacher remained in second and third place respectively, but Barrichello was overtaken by Frentzen into turn one, dropping him down to fifth place. Trulli rounded out the top six places at the end of lap 1. At the back of the field, Button gained six positions, moving from 21st to 15th position. This was partially due to a collision between Minardi driver Marc Gené and rookie Heidfeld, which left Gené last in the order as he had to pit for repairs.

Jaguar driver Johnny Herbert was the first person to retire, retiring with clutch problems on lap 2. By lap 4, the two McLarens of Häkkinen and Coulthard, along with Schumacher, were already pulling away from Frentzen's Jordan, who was five seconds behind Schumacher. On lap 7, the front suspension on the Arrows car of Pedro de la Rosa failed, sending him into a tyre barrier. Herbert's teammate, Irvine spun trying to avoid the Arrows car. Irvine could not get the Jaguar going again as it suffered an engine failure. Both retired from the race. The safety car was deployed to slow the other cars down so the marshals could clear up the wreckage.

When the green flag was given at the end of lap 10, Coulthard slowed dramatically and came in for a pit stop with engine problems. Coulthard returned to the track, but the problem continued and forced his retirement on lap 11. Schumacher was now promoted to second, with Frentzen in third place. Barrichello was in fourth place, with Trulli fifth. Behind the top five, BAR driver Jacques Villeneuve was in sixth place, heading a queue of cars down to 12th place Button. Häkkinen retired on lap 18, with the same problem as his teammate; a double retirement almost identical to the 1999 race. With Häkkinen's retirement, Schumacher led by 16.5 seconds from Frentzen in second. Schumacher made his one and only pit stop on lap 29, giving Frentzen the lead. Schumacher rejoined the track in third, just in front of Trulli. Barrichello was the next driver of the front running cars to pit on lap 33, but the Ferrari team switched him to a two stop strategy so that he could move ahead of Frentzen.

Trulli retired his Jordan car on lap 36 with gearbox problems. The retirements and pit stops moved Button up the order, putting the Williams driver in third place before his pit stop on lap 36. Frentzen also made a pit stop on lap 36, but the Jordan mechanics experienced problems while refuelling the car, costing Frentzen over ten seconds in the stop. Frentzen rejoined the track in sixth, however retired three laps later with gearbox problems. Barrichello took the lead on lap 45, overtaking teammate Schumacher before making his second pit stop. Barrichello rejoined the track second.

The retirements of the McLaren and Jordan team cars elevated Ralf Schumacher, Button's Williams teammate, into third position. Villeneuve was fourth, Giancarlo Fisichella was fifth in the Benetton, with Button sixth. With 11 laps remaining Button retired from the race with an engine failure. Ricardo Zonta, in a BAR, was promoted to sixth, but was overtaken by Salo with a few laps remaining. Schumacher won the race after 58 laps in a time 1:34:01.987, twelve seconds ahead of second placed Barrichello, who completed a Ferrari one-two finish. Ralf Schumacher was classified third, with Villeneuve close behind in fourth, giving BAR their first ever points in Formula One. Fisichella finished fifth, with Salo initially classified as sixth in the Sauber. However, a few hours after the race, Salo was disqualified from the race for a bodywork infringement, promoting Zonta into sixth position.

Post-race 
After the race, Michael Schumacher said:

Race classification

Championship standings after the race

Drivers' Championship standings

Constructors' Championship standings

Note: Only the top 5 positions are show for both sets of standings.

References

Grand Prix
Australian Grand Prix
Australian Grand Prix
Australian Grand Prix